South St. Paul Secondary (also known as South St. Paul High School) is a public high school in South St. Paul, Minnesota, United States. It is part of the South St. Paul Public Schools district, and is an International Baccalaureate World School.

History 
Construction was started on the original building in 1905; the school opened on January 23, 1907, as Central High. It was renamed to its current name in 1911, when a new building was constructed. An expansion occurred in 1923 and an auditorium and athletic fields were finished in 1930. In the early twentieth century, the school housed night classes for immigrants who wished to gain American citizenship.

Athletics 
South St. Paul athletic teams are nicknamed "Packers" and compete in the Metro East Conference.

Performing arts 
SSP has two competitive show choirs, the mixed-gender "SouthSide Sensation" and the all-female "Diamond Divaz".

Notable alumni 
 Gene Anderson, professional wrestler
 Jim Carter, football player
 Justin Faulk, hockey player
 John Gaub, baseball player
 Grant Hart, musician
 Karin Housley, politician and businesswoman
 Phil Housley, hockey player
 Jim LeClair, football player
 Sunisa Lee, gymnast
 Betty McCollum, congresswoman
 Warren Miller, hockey player
 Tim Pawlenty, businessman and politician
 Alex Stalock, hockey player
 Adam Wilcox, hockey player
 Doug Woog, hockey player, coach and broadcaster

References

External links 
 

Schools in Dakota County, Minnesota
Public high schools in Minnesota
International Baccalaureate schools in Minnesota